Luke Trickett is a former national team swimmer from Australia. He is the husband of fellow Australian swimmer Libby Trickett (née Lenton).

At the 2002 Oceania Swimming Championships, he won the 200 breaststroke in a then Championships Record of 2:16.38. He also finished second in the 50 and 100 breaststrokes.

He also was a finalist in the 50m breaststroke at the 2008 Australian Trials.

References

Year of birth missing (living people)
Australian male breaststroke swimmers
Living people